Imam Uddin Ahmad is a Awami League politician and the former Member of Parliament of Faridpur-5.

Early life 
Ahmad was born in 1935  in Faridpur District, East Bengal, British India.

Career 
Ahmad was involved with the Bengali Language movement in 1952. He was elected to parliament from Faridpur-5 as an Awami League candidate in 1973. After the Assassination of Sheikh Mujibur Rahman he was appointed the President of Faridpur District unit of Awami League.

Death 
Ahmad died on 12 February 2006.

References 

Awami League politicians
2006 deaths
1st Jatiya Sangsad members
1930 births